Azaziah may refer to:

 One of the Levitical musicians during the transportation of the Ark of the Covenant (I Chronicles 15:21).
 The father of Hoshea, who was made ruler over the Ephraimites (I Chronicles 27:20).
 A Levite who had charge of the temple offerings in the days of Hezekiah (II Chronicles 31:13).

References

Set index articles on Hebrew Bible people